The Communist Party of Korea was a communist party in Korea. It was founded during a secret meeting in Seoul in 1925. The Governor-General of Korea had banned communist and socialist parties under the Peace Preservation Law (see History of Korea), so the party had to operate in a clandestine manner. The leaders of the party were Kim Yong-bom and Pak Hon-yong.

First attempt
After several failed attempts to establish a communist party, the Communist Party of Korea was formed on 17 April 1925. It was established by members of the Tuesday Society(화요회,火曜會), and its Founding Congress was attended by 15 individuals. The congress established a Central Executive Committee with seven members and a three member Central Inspection Committee. The following day, on 18 April, it convened the first meeting of the Central Executive Committee (CEC) in Kim Chan's home. The meeting delegated work responsibilities among the CEC members; Kim Chae-bong was assigned secretarial work, organizational affairs to Cho Tong-ho, propaganda work to Kim Chan, personnel affairs to Kim Yak-su, labour and agricultural affairs to Chong Un-hae, politics and economics to Yi Chin-hi and security to Chu Chong-gon. A decision on establishing a Communist Youth League was made at the meeting, and elected Pak Hon-yong as head of secretarial work, organisational work to Kwon O-sol, propaganda to Shin Chol-su, education and training to Kim Tan-ya, security to Hong Chung.sik, and the liaison brief to Cho Pong-am. Cho Tong-ho was put in charge of making a draft constitution and bylaws for the party, and was sent to the Soviet Union in May 1925 to get official recognition from the Communist International (Comintern), which it received in May 1926.

However, several communists ended up being imprisoned at a wedding celebration in November 1925. Several communists attended the wedding, including Tokko Chon and Kim Kyong-so, and became involved in a brawl with Japanese police in which they made their political views clear. On further investigation, the Japanese police managed to find several party documents and communist materials in the suspect's home. Ultimately, the Japanese police arrested an estimated 100 individuals and convicted 83 for illegally establishing a communist organisation. This effectively dissolved the Communist Party. Korea scholars Robert A. Scalapino and Chong-Sik Lee note that "The period immediately after 1925 was one of unending frustration and failure for the Korean Communists. Within three years, there no less than four attempts to establish a Korean Communist Party. Each rapidly ended in failure."

The party became the Korean section of the Communist International at the 6th congress of the international in August–September 1928. But after only a few months as the Korean Comintern section, the perpetual feuds between rival factions that had plagued the party from its foundation led the Comintern to disband the Communist Party of Korea in December of the same year. However, the party continued to exist through various party cells. Some communists, like Kim Il-sung went into exile in China, where they joined the Chinese Communist Party. In the early 1930s, Korean and Chinese communists began guerrilla activity against the Japanese forces.

Post-war period (1945–46)
After liberation from the Japanese occupation in 1945, the situation for the Korean communists changed considerably. The country was divided into United States and Soviet occupation zones, and the working conditions for the party were very different in the two zones.

In the South, the party leader Pak Hon-yong, who had been a resistance fighter, and became active in Seoul upon his release in 1945. He reorganized a Central Committee, of which he became the Secretary. Being based in Seoul, he had limited contact with the Soviet occupation forces in the north.

The Soviet Red Army liberated northern Korea in August 1945. Most members of the Communist Party of Korea were in southern Korea and there were very few Communist cadres in the north. The Soviets began to rely largely on exiled communists who returned to Korea at the end of World War II as well as ethnic Koreans who were part of the large Korean community in the USSR and therefore Soviet citizens.

Kim Il-sung became a prominent figure of the party in the northern areas. After his years as a guerilla leader, Kim Il-sung had moved to the Soviet Union (where historians believe his son Kim Jong-il was born in 1941) and had become a Captain in the Red Army. His battalion arrived in Pyongyang just as the Soviets were looking for a suitable person who could assume a leading role in North Korea.

On October 13, 1945 the North Korea Bureau of the Communist Party of Korea was established. Though technically under the control of the Seoul-based party leadership, the North Korean Bureau had little contact with Seoul and worked closely with the Soviet Civilian Authority. The first chairman of the Bureau was Kim Yong-bom who had been sent to Korea by the Comintern in the 1930s to conduct underground activity. Kim Il-sung was a member of the Bureau at its founding and replaced Kim Yong-bom as chairman in December 1945. Official North Korean historians later disputed this, claiming that Kim Il-sung had become its chairman from the onset of the Bureau. Moreover, official North Korean sources claim that the meeting was held on October 10. October 10 is regarded as the "Party Foundation Day" in North Korea, on which Kim Il-sung formed the first genuine Marxist–Leninist party in the country. Official North Korean historians seek to downplay the role of early communist leaders like Pak Hon-yong. Official North Korean sources claim that the name of the Bureau was changed to 'Organizational Committee of the Communist Party of North Korea' (often simply referred to as the 'Communist Party of North Korea').

On July 22, 1946, the North Korea Bureau joined with the New People's Party of Korea, the Democratic Party and the Chondoist Chongu Party (supporters of an influential religious movement) to form the North Korean Fatherland United Democratic Front.

On July 29, 1946, the New People's Party and the North Korea Bureau held a joint plenum of the Central Committees of both parties and agreed to merge into a single entity. A founding conference of the Workers' Party of North Korea was held on August 28–30.

In September 1946 the Communist Party of Korea led a nationwide general strike.  At its peak more than 250,000 workers had joined the strike, which evolved into the  first of October Daegu Uprising (Autumn Uprising).

The remainder of the party, still functioning in the southern areas, worked under the name of Communist Party of South Korea. The party merged with the southern remainder of the New People's Party and a faction of the People's Party of Korea (the so-called forty-eighters), founding the Workers' Party of South Korea on November 23, 1946.

See also

 Workers' Party of Korea
 Party Foundation Day

Notes

References

Specific

Bibliography
 Books
 

1925 establishments in Korea
1946 establishments in Korea
Korea
Communist parties in Korea
Defunct political parties in Korea
History of the Workers' Party of Korea
Political parties disestablished in 1946
Political parties established in 1925